NGC 5705 is a spiral galaxy in the constellation Virgo.  NGC 5705 is part of a small group of spiral galaxies that also includes NGC 5691, NGC 5713, and NGC 5719. It is a member of the NGC 5746 Group of galaxies, itself one of the Virgo III Groups strung out to the east of the Virgo Supercluster of galaxies.

References

External links 
 

Barred spiral galaxies
5705
52395
09447
Virgo (constellation)